The ISSF Junior World Championship was introduced by the International Shooting Sport Federation in 2017. It covers a variety of both Olympic and non-Olympic events in rifle, pistol and shotgun, with individual and team events.

The ISSF defines a 'junior' as an athlete under the age of 21 on December 31 of the competition year.

Championships

Events

The following events are currently featured in the ISSF Junior World Championships:

Rifle
 10 meter air rifle (I, T, X)
 50 meter rifle prone (I)
 50 meter rifle three positions (I, T, X)

Pistol
 10 meter air pistol (I, T, X)
 25 meter pistol (I, T)
 25 meter rapid fire pistol (I, T, X)

Shotgun
 Trap (I, T, X)
 Skeet (I, T, X)

I = individual; T = team; X = mixed team

The following events were also contested in previous editions:

Rifle
 50 meter rifle prone (T)

Pistol
 25 meter standard pistol (I, T)
 50 meter pistol (I, T)

Shotgun
 Double trap (I, T)

I = individual; T = team; X = mixed team

References

External links 
 Official Website

ISSF shooting competitions